Chronówek  is a village in the administrative district of Gmina Orońsko, within Szydłowiec County, Masovian Voivodeship, in east-central Poland. In 2021, the village had a population of 100 people.

References

Villages in Szydłowiec County